Glyn Parry may refer to:

 Glyn Parry (historian) (born 1953), Welsh historian at Victoria University Wellington, New Zealand
 Glyn Parry (author) (born c. 1959), Australian writer of children's literature, young-adult fiction, and speculative fiction